Dexaminidae is a family of amphipods. It contains the following genera:
Delkarlye J. L. Barnard, 1972
Dexamine Leach, 1814
Dexaminella Schellenberg, 1928
Dexaminoculus Lowry, 1981
Guernea Chevreux, 1887
Haustoriopsis Schellenberg, 1938
Neotropis Costa, 1853
Polycheria Haswell, 1879
Paradexamine Stebbing, 1899
Prophlias Nicholls, 1939
Sebadexius Ledoyer, 1984
Syndexamine Chilton, 1914
Tritaeta Boeck, 1876

References

Gammaridea
Crustacean families